Silsbee is a town in Hardin County, Texas, United States. This town is 21 miles north of Beaumont. The population was 6,935 at the 2020 census. It is part of the Beaumont–Port Arthur metropolitan area.

Geography

Silsbee is located in eastern Hardin County at  (30.348095, –94.180220). U.S. Route 96, a four-lane bypass, forms the southeast border of the city; the highway leads northeast  to Jasper and south  to Beaumont. Texas State Highway 327 runs through downtown Silsbee south of the city center, leading east to US 96 and west  to Kountze, the Hardin county seat.

Historical development
Silsbee was first referred to as "Mill Town" when the site was reached by the Gulf, Beaumont, and Kansas City Railway in 1894. The town was renamed in recognition of Nathaniel Devereux Silsbee, an investor (and grandson of Sen. Nathaniel Silsbee) from Boston, Massachusetts, who helped provide funds for the railway. The railroad was a project of John Henry Kirby, who established the Kirby Lumber Company in the city. This business was the main employer and strength of the Silsbee economy from the city's beginning.

Demographics

As of the 2020 United States census, there were 6,935 people, 2,441 households, and 1,745 families residing in the city.

As of the census  of 2010,  6,611 people, 2,520 households, and 1,763 families resided in the city. The population density was 881.5 people per square mile (327.8/km). The 2,790 housing units averaged 353.5 per square mile (136.5/km). The racial makeup of the city was 65.8% White, 30.3% African American, 0.4% Native American, 0.6% Asian, 0.015% Pacific Islander, 1.4% from other races, and 01.5% from two or more races. Hispanics or Latinos of any race were 4.0% of the population.

Of the 2,520 households, 30.8% had children under the age of 18 living with them, 47.1% were married couples living together, 18.4% had a female householder with no husband present, and 30.0% were not families; 10.5% of all households were made up of individuals, and 12.0% had someone living alone who was 65 years of age or older. The average household size was 2.52 and the average family size was 3.04.

In the city, the population was distributed as 25.7% under the age of 18, 8.2% from 19 to 24, 23.1% from 25 to 44, 25.6% from 45 to 64, and 17.4% who were 65 years of age or older. The median age was 34.7 years. Of the entire population, 45.9% were male and 54.1% were female.  Of those individuals age 18 and over, 32.5% were male and 67.5% were female.

The median income for a household in the city was $49,121, and for a family was $51,518. About 16.6% of the population was below the poverty line;  14.0% of families were below the poverty line, while only 3.9% of married families were in poverty.  Of those age 65 or over, 4.4% were below the poverty line.

Education

The city is served by the Silsbee Independent School District, with a total of four schools—Laura Reeves Elementary (Pre-K–K),  Silsbee Elementary (1–5), Edwards-Johnson Memorial Silsbee Middle School (6–8), and Silsbee High School (9–12).

Notable people
 Curtis Buckley, NFL Football star for multiple teams within the league
 Len Garrett, football player
 Mark Henry, actor, powerlifter, Olympic weightlifter, strongman, and retired professional wrestler
 James Hunter, football player
 Chloe Jones, pornographic actress
 Brandi McCain, basketball player
 Hannah Read, indie rock musician who performs under the stage name Lomelda
 LaQuan Stallworth, basketball player
 Michael Tuck, television newscaster in San Diego, California

References

External links
 
 City of Silsbee official website
 Silsbee Chamber of Commerce
 

Cities in Texas
Cities in Hardin County, Texas
Beaumont–Port Arthur metropolitan area
Logging communities in the United States
1894 establishments in Texas